SS Mission San Jose was a Type T2-SE-A2 tanker built for the United States Maritime Commission during World War II. After the war she was acquired by the United States Navy as USS Mission San Jose. Later the tanker transferred to the Military Sea Transportation Service as USNS Mission San Jose.

Career 
Mission San Jose was laid down 17 July 1943 under a Maritime Commission contract by Marine Ship Corporation, Sausalito, California; launched 7 October 1943; sponsored by Mrs. Robert L. Bridges and delivered 29 January 1944. Chartered to Pacific Tankers Inc. for operations, she spent the remainder of the war carrying fuel to Allied forces overseas. She served in this capacity until 3 May 1946, when she was returned to the Maritime Commission and laid up in the Maritime Reserve Fleet at Mobile, Alabama.

Acquired by the Navy on 5 November 1947, she was placed in service with the Naval Transportation Service as Mission San Jose (AO-125). After 1 October 1949, she was under the operational control of the new Military Sea Transportation Service (MSTS) as USNS Mission San Jose (T-AO-I25). She served with MSTS until 15 October 1957, when she was struck from the Naval Vessel Register and transferred to the Maritime Administration (MARAD) for lay up in the Maritime Reserve Fleet at Suisun Bay, California.

The ship was sold to the Hudson Waterways Corporation on June 24, 1966, and renamed Seatrain Ohio. She was subsequently lengthened using sections of two other T2 tankers, the Tomahawk and Mission San Diego, and rebuilt by Maryland Shipbuilding and Drydock Company into one of seven Seatrain Lines multi-purpose cargo ships capable of carrying general bulk and palletized cargo, intermodal containers, vehicles and rail cars. Upon completion of the conversion and delivery in 1967 Seatrain Ohio, IMO 6621234, was chartered to the MSTS in support of overseas U.S. military operations, including the transport of material, equipment and aircraft to Vietnam. The ship was transferred to the National Defense Reserve Fleet (James River) in November 1973 and on August 8, 1978, her name was changed to just Ohio. In 1990 Ohio was reactivated for service in support of the First Persian Gulf War and subsequently returned to the Reserve Fleet (Beaumont, Texas). The ship was retired and broken up in 2011.

References

External links 

 

Type T2-SE-A2 tankers
Ships built in Sausalito, California
1943 ships
World War II tankers of the United States
Historic American Engineering Record in Texas
San Jose
Type T2-SE-A2 tankers of the United States Navy